The 1st Marine Logistics Group (1st MLG) is a logistics unit of the United States Marine Corps and is headquartered at Marine Corps Base Camp Pendleton, California, with several subordinate elements also located at Marine Corps Air Station Yuma and Marine Corps Air Ground Combat Center Twentynine Palms.

Subordinate units

The 1st Marine Logistics Group currently comprises: (Adjacent graphic is incorrect: 1. CLR 1 is not shown; 2. 17 CLR should be "Combat Logistics Regiment 17"; 3. 7th ESB should be listed below CLR 17)

 Combat Logistics Regiment 1
 Combat Logistics Regiment 17
 1st Dental Battalion
 1st Maintenance Battalion
 1st Medical Battalion
 1st Supply Battalion
 7th Engineer Support Battalion

History

The current 1st Marine Logistics Group was activated on 30 March 1976. The lineage of 1st MLG dates back to 1 July 1947 when it was activated as the 1st Combat Service Group (1st CSG), Service Command, Fleet Marine Force at Pearl Harbor, Hawaii. In the same month, 1st CSG was relocated to Marine Corps Base Camp Pendleton, California.

Korean War
In August 1950, 1st CSG was deployed to Kobe, Japan; and was subsequently deployed in September 1950 to Inchon, Korea, assigned to the 1st Marine Division. They participated in the Korean War, fighting at Inchon-Seoul, Chosin Reservoir, the East-Central front, and the Western front. In August 1951, they were reassigned to the Fleet Marine Force; and in October 1951, reassigned to the 1st Marine Division. In May 1953, they were again reassigned to Fleet Marine Force and relocated to MCB Camp Pendleton, California.

On 1 March 1957, 1st CSG was redesignated as the 1st Force Service Regiment.

Vietnam War
In May 1965 detachments of 1st FSR were sent to Okinawa and Vietnam. In August 1965 Headquarters Battalion, 1st FSR were sent to Vietnam.

In February 1967, the 1st Force Service Regiment was deployed to the Republic of Vietnam. On 15 February 1967, they were redesignated/assigned as the 1st Force Service Regiment, Force Logistic Command, Fleet Marine Force and assigned to the III Marine Amphibious Force.

They participated in the Vietnam War from February 1967 to April 1971, operating from Da Nang, South Vietnam.

1970s
On 23 April 1971, 1st Force Service Regiment was relocated to Camp Pendleton, California. Then on 30 April 1976, they were redesignated as 1st Force Service Support Group (1st FSSG).

1990s
In the 1990s, 1st FSSG participated in Operation Desert Shield and Operation Desert Storm from September 1990 to April 1991; and in Operation Restore Hope in Somalia from December 1992 to February 1993.

Global War on Terror

The Marines of 1st MLG were deployed to Iraq in support of Operation Iraqi Freedom on four occasions.

First deployment
The 1st FSSG deployed to Iraq in early 2003 in response to the continual rejection of UN inspectors. In March 2003, 1st FSSG elements joined the 1st Marine Expeditionary Force (I MEF) in the crossing into Iraq. After approximately one month and the fall of Bagdad, the war was declared over. The Marines of 1st FSSG along with the 1st MEF redeployed back into the States over the rest of the summer 2003.

Second deployment
In January 2004, the 1st FSSG deployed to Iraq for a second time – for 14 months to various camps in Iraq to include Camp Taqaddum (Headquarters), Camp Fallujah, Al Asad Air Base, Camp Habbiniyah, and, after the Abu Ghraib scandal, they took over guarding the prison as well. The group was involved with Operation Al Fajr (The Second Battle of Fallujah), the operation to retake the city of Fallujah. The artillery that helped bombard the city were stationed in the 1st FSSG HQ area. They returned to Camp Pendleton in early 2006.

In October 2005, the group was redesignated as 1st Marine Logistics Group in an effort to make the name reflect the mission. The lower subordinate units were reorganized and some renamed.

 Third deployment
In February 2007, the Group returned from their third deployment, having served in several locations, including Camp Fallujah, Camp Taqaddum and Al Asad Air Base. The deployment was part of two seven-month assignments, but many Marines stayed for the greater duration of 14 months.

 Fourth deployment

In February 2008, under the command of BGen Robert R. Ruark, took over for the 2nd Marine Logistics Group (Forward) at Camp Taqaddum, operating in Al Anbar Province.

 Post-OIF period
From March 2010 to March 2011 and from February 2012 to September 2012, 1st MLG participated in Operation Enduring Freedom in Afghanistan.  Elements of 1st MLG once again participated In Operation Enduring Freedom in Afghanistan from January 2014 to December 2014.

Elements of 1st MLG also participated in Operation Inherent Resolve in Iraq and Syria from August 2014 through into 2019.

Awards
   Presidential Unit Citation with two Bronze Stars
   Joint Meritorious Unit Award
   Navy Unit Commendation with one Silver Star and one Bronze Star
   Meritorious Unit Commendation with one Bronze Star
   National Defense Service Medal with three Bronze Stars
   Korean Service Medal with two Silver Stars
   Armed Forces Expeditionary Medal
   Vietnam Service Medal with two Silver Stars and one Bronze Star
   Southwest Asia Service Medal with two Bronze Stars
   Afghanistan Campaign Medal with two Bronze Stars
   Iraq Campaign Medal with one Silver Star and two Bronze Stars
   Global War on Terrorism Expeditionary Medal
   Global War on Terrorism Service Medal
   Korean Presidential Unit Citation
   Vietnam Cross of Gallantry with Palm
   Vietnam Meritorious Unit Civil Actions Medal with Palm

See also

List of United States Marine Corps logistics groups
Smoke the Donkey

Notes

References
This article incorporates text in the public domain from the United States Marine Corps.
1st MLG History & Lineage, 1st MLG website, USMC. (URL accessed 13 June 2011).

External links
 

1